The Moonshine War is a 1970 American crime comedy-drama film directed by Richard Quine, based on the 1969 novel of the same name by Elmore Leonard.  It stars Patrick McGoohan, Richard Widmark, Alan Alda, and Will Geer.

Plot
John "Son" Martin owns and operates a profitable still, making moonshine whiskey in Prohibition-era Kentucky. One day, he gets a visit from an old Army acquaintance, Frank Long, who is now an Internal Revenue agent.

When Frank is unable to persuade Son to cut him in on the profits, or even reveal where the moonshine is hidden, in exchange for Frank looking the other way, Frank calls in the dangerous Dr. Emmett Taulbee, who uses more violent methods in getting what he wants.

Emmett and his henchmen go too far, killing Sheriff Baylor and even Emmett's girlfriend when she tries to get away. Frank can see that he made a mistake, so he volunteers to help Son fend off the gang. Still outnumbered, Son finally tells Emmett's men where the moonshine is buried in exchange for his life. However, when the crooks start digging, they set off Son's buried dynamite.

Cast

 Patrick McGoohan as Frank Long
 Richard Widmark as Dr. Emmett Taulbee
 Alan Alda as John W. (Son) Martin
 Melodie Johnson as Lizann Simpson
 Will Geer as Sheriff Baylor
 Joe Williams as Aaron
 Suzanne Zenor as Miley Mitchell
 Lee Hazlewood as Dual Metters
 Max Showalter as Mr. Worthman
 Harry Carey, Jr. as Arley Stamper
 Tom Nolan as Lowell
 Richard Peabody as Boyd Caswell
 John Schuck as E.J. Royce 
 Bo Hopkins as Bud Blackwell
 Charles Tyner as Mr. McClendon
 Terry Garr as Young Wife
 Claude Johnson as Young Man
 Dick Crockett as Carl
 Patty Sauers as Waitress
 Tom Skeritt as Neighbor (uncredited)

Production
In October 1968 it was announced film rights to the novel had been purchased by Filmways with MGM to release. In March 1969 Richard Quine signed to direct. In June, Patrick McGoohan, who had just made Ice Station Zebra for Filmways and MGM, signed to play the lead. "You have to do something from time to time to pay the rent", said the actor.

Filming started August 1969. It was one of eight features greenlit under the new regime at MGM headed by Louis Polk and Herb Solow, the others being False Witness, The Magic Garden of Stanley Sweetheart (filmed in 1970), The Strawberry Statement (filmed in 1970), She Loves Me (planned for Julie Andrews but not filmed), The Adventures of Augie March, Man's Fate (planned by Fred Zinnemann but not filmed) and The Ballad of Dingus Magee (filmed in 1970).

The novel was published in September 1969. The New York Times called it "a near perfect shotgun opera."

The film went over budget.

See also
 List of American films of 1970

References

External links
 
 
 
 
 

1970s crime comedy-drama films
1970 films
American crime comedy-drama films
1970s English-language films
Films about prohibition in the United States
Films based on American novels
Films based on works by Elmore Leonard
Films directed by Richard Quine
Films set in 1932
Films set in Appalachia
Films set in Kentucky
Films with screenplays by Elmore Leonard
Filmways films
Metro-Goldwyn-Mayer films
Moonshine in popular culture
1970s American films